The Rensselaer–Union men's ice hockey rivalry is a college ice hockey rivalry between the RPI Engineers men's ice hockey and Union Dutchmen ice hockey programs. The first meeting between the two occurred on February 26, 1904.

History
Rensselaer was one of the first schools outside of the Ivy League to play varsity ice hockey, holing their first game during the 1901–02 season. Two years later, The Cherry and White met their capital district counterparts for the first time. Because neither program had an on-campus rink, the game was played at the Empire Rink in nearby Albany, New York. The converted curling venue wasn't well suited for ice hockey and only used sparingly by RPI. Both programs were forced to suspend operations over the next few years due to warm winters that prevented natural ice surfaces from being usable. They renewed their series in 1908, however, Union played just one game over the following two years before shuttering the program for a decade.

After World War I, Union restarted its program and the two eventually began to play annually. Helping the budding rivalry were on-campus rinks that had been built in the interim. While both venues were of the open-air variety, they were a vast improvement over the previous situation. Unfortunately, just as the rivalry was beginning to grow, financial difficulties brought on by The Great Depression caused Rensselaer to suspend its program in 1931. The Engineers attempted to return in the mid-30's but were only able to play 4 total games before having to halt once more. Union continued on in their rival's absence but they too were forced to suspend play after the outbreak of World War II. Once the war was over, the Skating Dutchmen tried to rekindle the program but their poor facilities became an issue. Inconsistent weather conditions wreaked havoc with open-air rinks and it had become apparent that Union could need an enclosed arena if they were to continue playing hockey. After only being able to play a single game in 1949, the program suspended until a permanent solution  could be found.

Coincidentally, the following year Rensselaer finally returned to the ice when the Houston Field House was completed. Rensselaer was able to use the new rink to great effect and became a preeminent program for a time. They won the 1954 National Championship under Ned Harkness and were a founding member of ECAC Hockey several years later.

In the mid-70's, after more than 25 years without a game, Union College resurrected its ice hockey program. The completion of the Achilles Rink in 1975 gave the Dutchmen the home they had needed while Harkness set about rebuilding the program from scratch. When Union returned, however, they did so at the Division II level and were able to immediately become a successful team. While there was an expectation that the program would soon make the jump to the top level, school administrators had other ideas. A dispute between Harkness and the college caused the coach to leave mid-way through his third season and set the program back by several years. It would be seven years before the Dutchmen would post another winning record and any rumors about their promotion to Division I were quashed.

in spite of the difficulties for Union, the program was able to restart its rivalry with Rensselaer in 1981. The two played at least one annually over a decade with the Engineers, predictably, dominating the play. When Union finally made the jump to Division I in 1991, they joined the Engineers in ECAC Hockey, where they have remained ever since (as of 2022).

Since becoming conference rivals, the two have played at least twice every year. They have also met several times during the conference postseason. In 2006, the two began jointly hosting the Governor's Cup, a four-team in-season tournament. The series was discontinued after the third edition. The trophy that was used was called the 'Mayor's Cup'. Rather than discard the award, it was used for a new annual game held at the end of January. The first two meetings were at the Herb Brooks Arena before being moved to the MVP Arena in Albany.

Game results
Full game results for the rivalry, with rankings beginning in the 1998–99 season.

Series facts

References

External links
 RPI Engineers men's ice hockey
 Union Dutchmen ice hockey

College ice hockey rivalries in the United States
ECAC Hockey
RPI Engineers men's ice hockey
Union Dutchmen ice hockey
1904 establishments in New York (state)